Shantiganj, formerly known as South Sunamganj or Dakshin Sunamganj, is an upazila of the Sunamganj District in Sylhet Division, Bangladesh.

Geography
Shantiganj is located in between 24°49' and 25°10' north latitudes and in between 91°14' and 91°27' east longitudes. The Surma River and Kalni River flow through Shantiganj. The Ufa, Karchabarar, Saladia, Behala, Baradal and Basadubi beels are other notable bodies of water in Shantiganj, in addition to the Dekhar haor. The upazila is bounded by Chhatak Upazila and Dowarabazar Upazila to the east, Derai Upazila and Jagannathpur Upazila to its south, Jamalganj Upazila to its west, and Sunamganj Sadar Upazila to its north.

History

Shantiganj was first established as an upazila on 6 June 2006 when it was separated from Sunamganj Sadar Upazila and given the name "South Sunamganj". On 26 July 2021, Khandker Anwarul Islam announced the renaming of South Sunamganj to "Shantiganj".

Demographical Data
Shantiganj has a total population of 183,881, per the 2011 census. There are 8 unions within the upazila, with a total of 107 mauzas and 171 villages.

With over 32,000 households, majority (80.6%) of these are kancha or kucha houses which are made from mud or clay, while a few are semi or full pucca houses. A small minority of these houses have access to sanitary latrine (29.2%), majority have non-sanitary latrine (60.4%) and 10.4% do not have toilet facilities available. Electricity within the upazila was available to 38.4% of the population.

The population is predominantly Muslim (90.3%) with a small minority of Hindus (9.7%) and very few following other religions.

Education
The literacy rate and school attendance is below average of the Sunamganj District, with 32.3% and 43.8% respectively. There are five madrasas in the upazila, including Jamia Islamia Haji Akram Ali Dakhil Madrasa and Amaria Islamia Alim Madrasa.

Administration
Shantiganj Upazila is divided into eight union parishads: Dargapasha, Joykalash, Paschim Birgaon, Paschim Pagla, Patharia, Purba Birgoan, Purba Pagla, and Shimulbak. The union parishads are subdivided into 102 mauzas and 171 villages.

Chairmen

Economy and tourism
There are 15 haat bazaars in Shantiganj. These are: Patharia Bazar, Pagla Bazar, Noakhali Bazar, Ganiganj Bazar, Birgaon Bazar, Taila Bazar, Natun Bangla Bazar, Aktapara Bazar, Damodharatapi Bazar, Chikarkandi Bazar, Muradpur Bazar, Jaikalas Bazar, Thakurbhog Bazar, Shantiganj Bazar and Bhamabhami Bazar.

Shantiganj Upazila is home to around 150 mosques, most notable of which is the historic Pagla Jame Mosque.

Notable people
 Muhammad Abdul Mannan, minister, diplomat and bureaucrat
 Faruk Rashid Chowdhury, communist
 Humayun Rashid Choudhury, diplomat and politician
 Shamsun Nahar Begum, former Member of Parliament

References

Upazilas of Sunamganj District